Byblos is the largest city in the Mount Lebanon Governorate of Lebanon.

Byblos may also refer to:

Byblos Bank, Byblos, Lebanon
Byblos Castle, Byblos, Lebanon
Byblos Club, a multi sports club based in Byblos, Lebanon
Byblos Port, Byblos, Lebanon
Byblos syllabary, an undeciphered writing system

See also

Byblos script (disambiguation)